= Lakhapur =

- village
- Location within Madhya Pradesh Location within India
- Coordinates: 23.230914°N 77.277855°E
- Country: India
- State: Madhya Pradesh
- District: Bhopal
- Tehsil: Huzur

Population (2011)
  - Total: 685
- Time zone: UTC+5:30 (IST)
- ISO 3166 code: MP-IN
- Census code: 482466

Lakhapur is a village in the Bhopal district of Madhya Pradesh, India. It is located in the Huzur tehsil and the Phanda block.

== Demographics ==
According to the 2011 census of India, Lakhapur has 99 households. The effective literacy rate (i.e. the literacy rate of population excluding children aged 6 and below) is 66.61%.

Demographics (2011 Census)
	Total	Male	Female
Population	685	346	339
Children aged below 6 years	101	48	53
Scheduled caste	119	67	52
Scheduled tribe	37	14	23
Literates	389	226	163
Workers (all)	311	178	133
Main workers (total)	254	169	85
Main workers: Cultivators	173	106	67
Main workers: Agricultural labourers	32	21	11
Main workers: Household industry workers	0	0	0
Main workers: Other	49	42	7
Marginal workers (total)	57	9	48
Marginal workers: Cultivators	30	4	26
Marginal workers: Agricultural labourers	21	2	19
Marginal workers: Household industry workers	2	1	1
Marginal workers: Others	4	2	2
Non-workers	374	168	206
